she is the fifth studio album by Canadian singer Dalbello, released in 1987 by EMI. The album included her biggest Canadian chart hits, "Tango" and "Black on Black".

"Black on Black" appeared in a different form on the soundtrack of the film 9½ Weeks.

"Black on Black" starts with a looped sample from Gregorio Allegri's work "Miserere mei, Deus".

Heart recorded a cover version of sorts with "Black on Black II" which became the most noteworthy version of the song as a Top 5 Billboard Rock Chart hit  on their 1993 album Desire Walks On. The Heart version is similar in structure but in a more heavy metal style and some minor changes to verses. On this version Dalbello provided backing vocals and shared writing credit with the Wilson sisters.

David Gilmour of Pink Floyd guests on guitar on the last song of the album, "Immaculate Eyes".

Track listing

Personnel
Musicians
 Dalbello — vocals, keyboards, Hammond B-3 organ, bass, drums, backing vocals
 Scott Humphrey — keyboards, Fairlight CMI, bass, drums, PPG Wave/HDD
 Lou Pomanti — keyboards
 Ron Cahute — accordion
 Asher Horowitz — guitar
 Kevin Breit — guitar
 David Gilmour — guitar on "Immaculate Eyes"
 Fergus Jemison Marsh — Chapman stick
 Steve Webster — bass
 Bernard Edwards — bass on "Tango"
 Eddie Zeeman — drums
 Kevin McKenzie — drums
 Steve Kendry — drums
 Anita Rossi — backing vocals

Technical
Lenny Derose — engineer, recording, mixing
 Richard Haughton — photography

References

External links

1987 albums
Lisa Dalbello albums
EMI Records albums